Fan You-chen (Amis: 林納斯 Lín Nàsī; born 3 November 1978), better known as Van Fan or Fan Yi-chen, is a Taiwanese singer and actor with ancestry from the Amis aborigine tribe. He is best known for Cape No. 7, the second top-selling film in Taiwanese cinematic history.

Fan made his debut in 2002 with the Chinese version theme song I Believe to the South Korean film My Sassy Girl. After a somewhat mediocre singing career, Fan started to show up in local TV series since 2005, and rose to fame in the Greater China Area in 2008 after the significant success of Cape No. 7, whose two theme songs As Happy as Can Be and South of Border are also sung by him.

In 2014, Fan played a role in the new film The Break-Up Artist. The film was shot in Beijing and Taiwan and was released on June 6, 2014.

Filmography
Mortal Ouija (2019)
52Hz, I Love You (2017)
Days of Our Own (2016)
Chinese Wine (2016)
E-commerce Times (2015)
Fighting Youth (2015)
Live With a Thief (2014)
The Break-Up Artist (2014)
Runaway Woman (2012)
Paradise Kiss (2012)
The Love Flu (2012)
Let It Be (2012)
Any Otherside (2012)
Gangster Rock (2010)
L-O-V-E (2009)
Cape No.7 (2008)

Discography

As a solo artist
 2002 : 1st Album 范逸臣
 2003 : 2nd Album 信仰愛情
 2004 : 3rd Album 愛情程式
 2006 : 4th Album 不說出的溫柔
 2008 : 無樂不作 ~ 精選輯
 2013 : 5th Album 搖滾吧，情歌

With Craze Band
 2010 : 初生之犢 1st Album

References

External links

Aboriginal singer Van Fan

Van Fan Official Blog

1978 births
Amis people
Living people
Taiwanese singer-songwriters
Taiwanese male film actors
Taiwanese Mandopop singer-songwriters
Taiwanese male television actors
People from Taitung County
21st-century Taiwanese male actors
21st-century Taiwanese singers